Dominic Thomas Knowles (born 13 February 1992) is an English footballer who plays for Curzon Ashton as a striker.

Career

Burnley
Born in Accrington, Lancashire, Knowles started his career at Burnley in 2008, coming through the youth system, but never made a first team appearance before his release in June 2012.

Spells at Gainsborough Trinity and Harrogate Town
Knowles joined Gainsborough Trinity, after failed trials with York City and Stevenage, he went on to score 10 goals in 18 appearances before being released after an unsanctioned trial with Burton Albion.

He then joined Harrogate Town, in January 2013 scoring 10 goals in 14 games before joining Burton Albion permanently in the summer of 2013.

Burton Albion
On 18 June 2013, Knowles was awarded a permanent contract, having spent the final months of the last term at Burton.

Kidderminster Harriers
On 30 January 2015, Dominic signed for Conference playoff hopefuls Kidderminster Harriers on loan till the end of the season. On 19 March, Dominic was recalled by his parent club.

Harrogate Town return
In July 2015 after his release from Burton Albion, he rejoined Harrogate Town on a 1-year deal. Scoring a goal on his first game back in pre-season vs Gateshead.

Boston United
On 20 June 2019, Knowles joined Boston United.

Curzon Ashton
On 1 October 2020, Knowles joined Curzon Ashton.

Career statistics

References

External links

1992 births
Living people
People from Accrington
Association football forwards
English footballers
Burnley F.C. players
Gainsborough Trinity F.C. players
Harrogate Town A.F.C. players
Burton Albion F.C. players
Boston United F.C. players
English Football League players
National League (English football) players
Kidderminster Harriers F.C. players